Georges Mendes (born 26 May 1974) is a Portuguese alpine skier. He competed in four events at the 1994 Winter Olympics. He was also the flag bearer for Portugal at the games.

References

External links
 

1974 births
Living people
Portuguese male alpine skiers
Olympic alpine skiers of Portugal
Alpine skiers at the 1994 Winter Olympics